WBNS (1460 kHz) — branded 1460 ESPN Columbus — is a commercial AM radio station in Columbus, Ohio. The station currently broadcasts a sports talk format and carries ESPN Radio programming. It is owned by Tegna Inc., along with WBNS-FM (97.1 MHz.) and WBNS-TV (channel 10). The three stations' studios and offices are located on Twin Rivers Drive, near Downtown Columbus; WBNS (AM)'s transmitter tower is located in East Columbus.

Overview

The station was first authorized, as WCAH, on May 13, 1922, and was originally owned by the Entrekin Electric Company of Columbus. The Wolfe family, owners of The Columbus Dispatch, bought the station in 1929 and in January 1934 changed the calls to the present WBNS– the call letters stand for "Wolfe Bank, Newspaper and Shoes"—the businesses controlled by the Wolfe family. (The WBNS stations maintained common ownership with the Dispatch until 2015, when the Wolfes sold the newspaper and related assets to New Media Investment Group.) WBNS was the longtime Columbus affiliate of the CBS Radio Network, and in the present-day serves as the AM flagship of the Ohio State Sports Network.

After various formats over the decades, including full service, Top 40, and MOR, in 2009 WBNS began simulcasting with WBNS-FM, which had previously aired an adult contemporary format. This was intended to improve the nighttime coverage for the station's longtime sports talk format, as well as Buckeyes football and basketball. The AM station must reduce its power to 1,000 watts at night, resulting in reduced coverage outside of Columbus itself. However, the FM station was branded as the main station, under the moniker "97.1 The Fan."

In 2011, the simulcast ended. The AM station began offering additional ESPN network programming and announced plans to create original local content such as an MMA show called "Ground & Pound", as well as a coach's show for the local MLS team, the Columbus Crew. On January 5, 2012 it was announced that the station would carry Cleveland Indians broadcasts in Columbus for the 2012 season, marking the return of the Indians after their absence from the Columbus market for the 2011 season.

WBNS is one of five stations remaining in the U.S. to broadcast using a Blaw-Knox tower that employed a distinctive diamond-shaped cantilever design.

On June 11, 2019, Dispatch announced it was selling its broadcasting assets, including the WBNS stations, to Tegna Inc. for $535 million in cash. The sale was completed on August 8.

References

External links
ESPN 1460

FCC History Cards for WBNS (covering 1927-1980 as WCAH / WBNS)

Tegna Inc.
BNS
Radio stations established in 1922
ESPN Radio stations
1922 establishments in Ohio
Radio stations licensed before 1923 and still broadcasting